Kim Byung-Chae (born April 14, 1981) is a South Korean football midfielder. He currently plays for  Chainat F.C. in the Thailand Division 1 League.

He played for several clubs, including FC Seoul, Gwangju Sangmu FC (Military service), Gyeongnam FC and Busan IPark, Daejeon Hydro & Nuclear Power FC in South Korea.

He was a member of the South Korea U-20 team.

Club career statistics

External links 
 

1981 births
Living people
Association football midfielders
South Korean footballers
South Korean expatriate footballers
FC Seoul players
FC Seoul non-playing staff
Gimcheon Sangmu FC players
Gyeongnam FC players
Busan IPark players
Kim Byung-chae
K League 1 players
Korea National League players
Footballers from Seoul
Expatriate footballers in Thailand
South Korean expatriate sportspeople in Thailand